Poblete is a municipality in Ciudad Real, Castile-La Mancha, Spain. As of 2018 it has a population of 2571.

References

Poblete is also used people's surname in Spain, Philippines, and the like countries.

Municipalities in the Province of Ciudad Real